Hurricane Joaquin was a powerful tropical cyclone that devastated several districts of The Bahamas and caused damage in the Turks and Caicos Islands, parts of the Greater Antilles, and Bermuda. It was also the strongest Atlantic hurricane of non-tropical origin recorded in the satellite era. The tenth named storm, third hurricane, and second major hurricane of the 2015 Atlantic hurricane season, Joaquin evolved from a non-tropical low to become a tropical depression on September 28, well southwest of Bermuda. Tempered by unfavorable wind shear, the depression drifted southwestward. After becoming a tropical storm the next day, Joaquin underwent rapid intensification, reaching hurricane status on September 30 and Category 4 major hurricane strength on October 1. Meandering over the southern Bahamas, Joaquin's eye passed near or over several islands. On October 3, the hurricane weakened somewhat and accelerated to the northeast. Abrupt re-intensification ensued later that day, and Joaquin acquired sustained winds of 155 mph (250 km/h), just short of Category 5 strength.

Hurricane warnings were hoisted across most of The Bahamas as the hurricane threatened the country. Battering the nation's southern islands for over two days, Joaquin caused extensive devastation, most notably on Acklins, Crooked Island, Long Island, Rum Cay, and San Salvador Island. Severe storm surge inundated many communities, trapping hundreds of people in their homes; flooding persisted for days after the hurricane's departure. Prolonged, intense winds brought down trees and powerlines, and unroofed homes throughout the affected region. As airstrips were submerged and heavily damaged, relief workers were limited in their ability to quickly help residents affected by Joaquin, one of the strongest storms on record to affect the nation. Offshore, the American cargo ship El Faro and her 33 members were lost to the hurricane.
 
Coastal flooding also impacted the nearby Turks and Caicos, washing out roadways, compromising seawalls, and damaging homes. Strong winds and heavy rainfall caused some property damage in eastern Cuba. One fisherman died when heavy seas capsized a small boat along the coast of Haiti. Storm tides resulted in severe flooding in several departments of Haiti, forcing families from their homes and destroying crops. The weakening hurricane passed just west of Bermuda on October 4, attended by strong winds that cut power to 15,000 electric subscribers but caused only minor damage otherwise. After passing near Bermuda, Joaquin ultimately curved northeastward and accelerated, weakening further and becoming extratropical as it entered colder waters. After dissipating, its remnants traveled eastward, reaching Portugal before being absorbed by a frontal system.

Collectively, Joaquin killed 34 people and caused US$200 million in damage. With all 34 deaths attributed to the storm occurring at sea, Joaquin has the highest offshore death toll for any Atlantic hurricane since the Escuminac hurricane in 1959, which killed 35 people in the Northumberland Strait.

Although Joaquin never directly affected the United States, another large storm system over the southeastern states drew tremendous moisture from the hurricane, resulting in catastrophic flooding in South Carolina.

Meteorological history

On September 25, 2015, the US National Hurricane Center (NHC) began monitoring an upper-level low, accompanied by a surface trough, several hundred miles south-southwest of Bermuda for possible tropical cyclogenesis. The system gradually consolidated as it drifted north-northwest, acquiring a closed surface low late on September 26. Convective showers and thunderstorms steadily increased on September 27, and at 03:00 UTC on September 28 the NHC assessed the system to have become a tropical depression, situated roughly 405 mi (650 km) southwest of Bermuda. Although the depression featured a well-defined low, strong wind shear displaced convection and exposed the circulation. A ridge to the north was forecast to steer the system slowly northwest into a region of higher shear; meteorologists at the NHC initially depicted the system dissipating within 96 hours based on modeling depictions. Convection developed and persisted closer to the circulation centre throughout September 28, and early on September 29, Dvorak satellite classifications indicated the system became a tropical storm. Accordingly, it was assigned the name Joaquin, becoming the tenth named storm of the season.

Strengthening of the mid-level ridge prompted a sudden shift in Joaquin's trajectory to the southwest, directing it towards the Bahamas. Forecasters at the NHC noted considerable uncertainty in the future of Joaquin, with forecast models depicting a wide range of possibilities. Throughout September 29, the storm steadily intensified as its circulation became embedded within deep convection and upper-level outflow became increasingly prominent. High sea surface temperatures and decreasing shear aided strengthening, and early on September 30, the storm achieved hurricane status. Rapid intensification ensued thereafter, with an eye developing within a symmetric central dense overcast. Data from aircraft reconnaissance indicated that Joaquin reached Category 3 status on the Saffir–Simpson hurricane wind scale by 03:00 UTC on October 1. Around 12:00 UTC the eye of Joaquin passed over Samana Cay, Bahamas, with winds of 130 mph (215 km/h), making it a Category 4 hurricane. At this time Joaquin was located just 15 mi (25 km) northwest of Crooked Island. The storm's central pressure bottomed out at 931 mbar (hPa) around 00:00 UTC on October 2.

As the ridge previously steering Joaquin southwest began retreating north, the hurricane's movement slowed and shifted west, and later north, early on October 2. An eyewall replacement cycle—a process whereby a second, larger eye develops while the inner eye collapses—began that morning; its eye became increasingly ill-defined in satellite imagery. Slight weakening took place accordingly, and the hurricane passed over Rum Cay and San Salvador Island around 16:00 UTC and 21:00 UTC with winds of 125 mph (205 km/h); a pressure near 944 mbar (hPa) was observed on San Salvador Island. An amplifying trough over the Southeastern United States enhanced southwesterly flow over Joaquin on October 3 and prompted the hurricane to accelerate northeast away from the Bahamas. Throughout the day the storm's eye became increasingly defined and re-intensification ensued. This made Joaquin the strongest Atlantic hurricane of non-tropical origin recorded in the satellite era.

Shortly after peaking, the hurricane's overall structure began to deteriorate, signalling a weakening trend. On October 4 the storm curved towards the north-northeast between a large low-pressure system to its west and a mid-level ridge to its east. The weakening trend slowed that day as the storm's satellite presentation improved slightly, marked by brief reappearances of a distinct eye feature. Joaquin gradually turned northeastward around the periphery of the weak ridge, and subsequently accelerated toward the east-northeast as it entered the prevailing westerlies. The system maintained hurricane intensity until 15:00 UTC on October 7, by which point strengthening wind shear and an increasingly colder environment began to take their toll. The cloud pattern became lopsided as colder, drier air infiltrated the circulation, forming the first stages of a frontal structure. During the next several days, Joaquin's extratropical remnant continued heading eastward across the Atlantic, before reaching Portugal on October 10. During the next 5 days, Joaquin's remnant slowly moved southward along the coast of Portugal, until the system was absorbed by another frontal system located east of Spain, on October 15.

Preparations

Tropical cyclone watches and warnings were posted throughout the Bahamas starting early on September 30 (UTC); by October 1, hurricane warnings extended from Grand Bahama Island in the northwest to Mayaguana in the southeast. As the storm moved away, the last advisories were discontinued by the morning of October 3. All schools on Exuma, Cat Island, San Salvador, and Rum Cay closed on the afternoon of October 1 until further notice. Bahamasair cancelled multiple domestic flights, and most airports throughout the island nation were closed, pending post-storm runway inspections. Several cruise ships scheduled to arrive at New Providence were diverted to other ports on October 2. Residents on Mayaguana were advised to evacuate. The nation's National Emergency Management Agency (NEMA) activated its Emergency Operations Center. As conditions worsened, residents in southern islands of the Bahamas criticized the government for providing inadequate warning, with no emergency preparations taking place on Acklins. NEMA refuted the claim and stated people were given ample warning but many residents refused to evacuate. In some instances, police were called in to forcibly move people to shelters.

In the Turks and Caicos Islands to the southeast of the Bahamas, the storm forced the closure of schools and government offices. Two cruise ships were redirected from the island, and Providenciales International Airport suspended operations for a time. The islands were placed under a tropical storm warning on October 1. On October 2 (UTC), tropical storm warnings were hoisted along coastal Camagüey, Las Tunas, Holguín, and Guantánamo provinces in Cuba.

On September 30, Virginian governor Terry McAuliffe declared a state of emergency for the entire state owing to heavy rains, unrelated to the hurricane, and the threat of Joaquin. The City of Norfolk also declared an emergency. Connecticut Governor Dannel Malloy advised residents to be prepared for potential impacts from the hurricane, as did Governor Andrew Cuomo of New York. On October 1, Governors Larry Hogan, Chris Christie, Pat McCrory, and Nikki Haley declared a state of emergency for Maryland, New Jersey, North Carolina, and South Carolina respectively. Ocracoke Island, North Carolina, was placed under a mandatory evacuation at 3:00 p.m. EDT (19:00 UTC). In New Jersey, the state of emergency caused the annual Bike MS: City to Shore Ride to be canceled for the first time in its 35-year history.

On the afternoon of October 2, a tropical storm watch was issued for Bermuda, and a hurricane warning was in effect late on October 3. As a precaution, Royal Bermuda Regiment soldiers were placed on standby, and some emergency equipment was stationed on the east end of the Causeway to prepare for the possibility of the road becoming impassable; officials ultimately closed the Causeway late on October 4, near the height of the storm, and partially reopened it the next morning. By October 3, two cruise ships had canceled their scheduled stops to Bermuda. Most commercial flights to and from the island on October 4 were canceled, and L.F. Wade International Airport suspended all operations that afternoon. Public and private schools were scheduled to close on October 5, though one institution was prepared for use as an emergency shelter. The approaching hurricane halted ferry and bus services.

Impact and aftermath

Bahamas

Large swells ahead of the storm's arrival in the Bahamas washed out a main road on San Salvador Island. Widespread power outages affected several islands as the hurricane closed in. Reports of flooding and people in need of assistance were received from Acklins, Crooked Island, Exuma, and Long Island. Power and communication failures plagued the nation's southeastern islands, leaving several islands effectively isolated in the immediate aftermath of Joaquin. The hurricane took all 59 of BTC's cell sites offline, most of them being returned to service within two weeks. By October 21, the Bahamas Electricity Corporation had remedied about 80% of its power outages, aided by crews from New Providence and the Caribbean Association of Electric Utilities group. Early aerial surveys revealed that Acklins, Rum Cay, Crooked Island, and San Salvador Island were "completely devastated". Throughout the archipelago, flooding from the hurricane trapped over 500 residents.

The hurricane "completely destroyed" a Bahamas Electricity Corporation power plant, where two large diesel tanks were shifted off their bases, allowing more than 10,000 gallons of fuel to leak into the ground. In the days following the storm, about 100 evacuees—including 46 from Crooked Island—were flown to New Providence, where several of them sought medical attention. On Long Island and Crooked Island, septic tank seepage contaminated residential wells, leaving residents without clean drinking water. Both areas still had extensive standing water on October 7. Acklins endured severe flooding, with many homes inundated and numerous calls for rescue; the island's sea barrier was breached by 9:00 a.m. local time. Some residents reported the entire island to be under water. A bridge in Lovely Bay was completely destroyed.

Southern areas of the island suffered considerable devastation; the surge washed out coastal roadways and drove numerous fishing boats ashore. The district's Member of Parliament, Loretta Butler-Turner, estimated that 75% of all fishing vessels there were destroyed. This, combined with heavy losses to farms and crops, threatened the livelihoods of many residents. About 20 individuals required rescue on Long Island, while some hurricane shelters became compromised by water entrance. The bodies of dead animals were seen floating in the water. Strong winds unroofed dozens of homes, and many structures were fully destroyed. Northern parts of the island fared better in comparison. The winds and flooding took a large toll on native vegetation, even well inland.

Powerful winds brought down trees and utility poles on Rum Cay, clogging roadways. A number of homes were damaged or destroyed in the district; two grocery stores and a municipal dock also sustained damage. A church housing 32 evacuees became flooded and structurally compromised, forcing the inhabitants to relocate. Joaquin also damaged power lines in Exuma, where "extreme" flooding was reported. There was modest structural damage on Mayaguana, the easternmost island of the Bahamas.

Joaquin was one of the strongest known hurricanes to impact the Bahamas, and directly affected nearly 7,000 people there. Several weeks after the storm, officials estimated that 836 residences had been destroyed, including 413 on Long Island, 227 on San Salvador, 123 on Acklins, 50 on Crooked Island, and 23 on Rum Cay. The storm's effects were considered comparable to the destruction wrought by Hurricane Andrew in 1992, which struck the northwestern Bahamas as a Category 5. Initial claims of numerous casualties throughout the island chain proved unsubstantiated, and although one man died during the storm on Long Island, his death was unrelated to the hurricane. In the aftermath of the hurricane, one person was reported missing on Ragged Island, which escaped with relatively minor effects. Initial analysis determined that Joaquin resulted in $120.6 million in damage. However, one year later it was revealed that the storm actually caused $200 million in damage across the Bahamian archipelago. Due to low insurance penetration, insured losses were expected to account for no more than half of that total.

Airports in the hardest-hit districts were damaged, flooded, and carpeted in debris, forcing storm victims to rely on helicopters, seaplanes, and watercraft to deliver storm relief. Workers gradually cleared runways for emergency use in the days following the storm, and all airports were open for normal operations by October 9. By October 4, the Government of Jamaica and the United States Agency for International Development had donated 50 tonnes and just over 32 tonnes, respectively, of emergency supplies to the Bahamas. Private groups, local businesses, and non-governmental organizations, such as the Bahamas Red Cross, started donation drives and began distributing goods to storm victims. The Caribbean Disaster Emergency Management Agency arranged for three response teams to evaluate the situation on Acklins, Crooked Island and Long Island. BTC established communication centers on Ragged Island, Inagua, and Long Island, giving affected citizens the opportunity to contact family members for free.

A special committee was formed to oversee reconstruction efforts, while government officials began considering new laws to enact stricter building codes. The government pledged to help eligible homeowners rebuild and repair their property. On October 6, Prime Minister of the Bahamas Perry Christie signed an order waiving import duties on materials needed for rebuilding by storm victims and registered charities on 12 islands. Local leaders called for an extension of the three-month exemption period, which many saw as inadequate. In what residents feared to be a major economic setback, storm-related damage forced Club Med to delay the annual opening of its San Salvador resort—the largest employer on the island—by two months. At the end of October, the National Emergency Management Agency began to shift its focus from emergency relief distribution to permanent rebuilding efforts.

Parts of the Bahamas were affected by Hurricane Matthew the following year, Hurricane Irma in 2017, and Hurricane Dorian in 2019.

Sinking of El Faro

An American cargo ship—the  El Faro—went missing near Crooked Island with 33 crew members (28 Americans and 5 Poles) amid  seas near the hurricane's eyewall. The vessel was last reported to have lost propulsion and begun to list around 7:30 a.m. local time on October 1. Hurricane hunters aircraft investigating the storm flew much lower than normal in an unsuccessful effort to locate the stricken ship. The United States Coast Guard conducted searches during the day of October 2 without success; efforts resumed at dawn on October 3. Floating containers and "deck objects" were discovered by the Coast Guard on the next morning, and oil sheen was noted in the area, though it was not conclusively linked to the missing vessel. A  debris field consisting of wood, cargo, styrofoam, and other objects was discovered that afternoon. The Coast Guard called off search operations at sunset on October 7, with the ship and her crew presumed lost. One body, presumed to be from El Faro, was spotted but could not be recovered. A Navy salvage team was requested, at the behest of the National Transportation Safety Board, to search for the wreckage.

Greater Antilles: Cuba and Haiti
Though the storm's center remained north of the Greater Antilles, some coastal areas experienced rough winds and high seas. In Cuba, the station at Guantánamo Bay recorded gusts of 55 mph (89 km/h). The storm caused coastal flooding and damage to roofs in Granma Province; more than 100 homes were affected in the province. Rain from the storm somewhat alleviated conditions from a record drought in Granma, Guantánamo, and Santiago de Cuba provinces, though many reservoirs remained below 30 percent capacity in the latter. Niquero, Granma, saw  of rain.

Along the northern coast of Haiti's Tiburon Peninsula, high waves from the hurricane capsized a boat with two occupants, killing one of them. Many communes experienced significant coastal flooding from storm tides and active seas, which drove water up to half a kilometer inland. More than 100 homes in Artibonite were inundated, and the main road to Anse-Rouge was impassable. Strong winds brought down multiple trees in the commune of Grand-Saline, where severe flooding was also reported. In Nippes and Nord-Ouest, four emergency shelters housed nearly 300 individuals. Joaquin damaged banana and millet fields, killed a small number of livestock, and triggered several landslides. In the four hardest-hit departments, about 900 households were directly affected by the storm. The Haitian government distributed nearly 500 hygiene kits to 200 families in Nippes, while evacuees in Port-de-Paix received mattresses, bed sheets, hygiene kits, food kits, and clean water; Action Against Hunger also donated water purification tablets.

North of Haiti, the  cargo vessel Minouche began to sink in heavy weather. The U.S. Coast Guard safely rescued all 12 crew members from a life-raft late on October 1.

Bermuda

As conditions worsened throughout October 4, roadways on Bermuda became obstructed by debris and floodwaters, and electric crews combated growing power outages. By the next morning, the hurricane had cut power to over 15,000 customers; service was returned to the vast majority of households by October 8, despite further inclement weather briefly impeding restoration work. The historic Commissioner's House at the Bermuda Maritime Museum lost the last of its original roof, which was heavily damaged by hurricanes Fay and Gonzalo of October 2014. In general, however, property damage across the island was minor.

Elsewhere

In the Turks and Caicos Islands, heavy rains and storm surge from Joaquin compromised infrastructure, including roadways, docks, and bulkheads. The seawall along Front Street on Grand Turk Island was damaged, prompting officials to close part of the road. Multiple homes along the coast faced flooding and leaking roofs. In several areas, pounding surf brought about coastal erosion and deposited large volumes of seaweed. Providenciales International Airport remained closed for two days while its storm-damaged weather station awaited replacement. Additionally, the territory lost fruit and vegetable crops to the storm, especially at the government farm on North Caicos.

Although Joaquin ultimately tracked far to the east of the United States, a non-tropical low over the Southeast tapped into the hurricane's moisture. An atmospheric river developed between the two systems, resulting in record-shattering rains and flooding across North and South Carolina. Several areas of South Carolina saw accumulations exceeding the threshold for a 1-in-1,000-year event. The subsequent floods inundated large areas of the state—with areas around Charleston and Columbia hardest-hit—and killed 19 people. This storm caused an additional $2 billion (2015 USD) in damage.

Retirement 

On April 25, 2016, it was announced by the World Meteorological Organization that the name Joaquin would be retired, due to the severe damage in the Bahamas and sinking of the SS El Faro. The name was replaced with Julian for the 2021 Atlantic hurricane season.

See also

 List of Bermuda hurricanes
 List of Category 4 Atlantic hurricanes
 Hurricane Andrew (1992) – Caused severe damage and loss of life in the northwestern Bahamas before striking Florida as a Category 5
 Hurricane Frances (2004) – Before Joaquin, the most recent Category 4 hurricane to strike the Bahamas
 Hurricane Gonzalo (2014) – Struck Bermuda in October 2014, causing extensive destruction
 Hurricane Matthew (2016) – Caused extensive damage to the Bahamas as a Category 4 hurricane roughly a year after Joaquin
 Hurricane Irma (2017) – Caused extensive to catastrophic damage in the Caribbean and parts of the Bahamas, before making landfall in Florida
 Hurricane Maria (2017) – Caused catastrophic damage in Puerto Rico, before affecting the Bahamas and the Carolinas
 Hurricane Florence (2018) – Category 4 hurricane that caused catastrophic flooding in the Carolinas
 Hurricane Dorian (2019) – Another major hurricane that stalled over The Bahamas as a record-breaking Category 5

References

External links

 Advisory archive for Hurricane Joaquin at the U.S. National Hurricane Center.

Joaquin
2015 in the Caribbean
Hurricane Joaquin (2015)
Hurricane Joaquin (2015)
Hurricane Joaquin (2015)
Joaquin (2015)
Joaquin (2015)
Joaquin (2015)
Joaquin (2015)
Joaquin (2015)
Joaquin (2015)
September 2015 events in North America
October 2015 events in North America
Joaquin